The Adam Fox Building, is a historic mixed-use commercial building in Carmel-by-the-Sea, California. This building and the Schweninger Building a.k.a. Carmel Bakery, appear on the Sanborn Fire Maps for 1910. They are both unique for their second floor Victorian false-front bay windows. The two buildings are the oldest buildings that existed before the incorporation of Carmel-by-the-Sea in 1916. The structure is recognized as an important commercial building in the city's Downtown Conservation District Historic Property Survey, and was nominated and submitted to the California Register of Historical Resources on July 31, 2002. The building is now occupied by the Adam Fox Cutlery and the Bohemian Boutique.

History

The Adam Fox Building is a two-story wood frame mixed-use commercial building on Ocean Avenue between Mission and San Carlos Streets in Carmel-by-the-Sea, California. The building has two overhanging Victorian-style bay windows on the upper floor with a white stucco service, which is used as office space. It has Spanish tiles on a hipped roof. The ground floor has two retail shops with two large bay display windows and two recessed Dutch doors that leads to the shops, with the second door leading to the upper floor. It was built around 1906, along with the Schweninger Building, also known as the Carmel Bakery. It is one of the oldest buildings in downtown Carmel.

The Adam Fox Building qualifies for inclusion in the city's Downtown Conservation District Historic Property Survey, and has been nominated and submitted to the California Register of Historical Resources on July 31, 2002, by Richard N. Janick. The property is significant under the California Register criterion 3, in architecture, as a two-story wood frame Victorian style commercial building that is still standing on the south side of Ocean Avenue as it dates to the 1910s. The Adam Fox building is similar in design and age as the Schweninger Building, two blocks west on Ocean Avenue between Dolores and Lincoln Streets, known as the Carmel Bakery. Both buildings appear on the 1910 Sanborn Fire Maps and are unique for their second floor Victorian false-front bay windows. The two buildings are the oldest buildings before the incorporation of Carmel-by-the-Sea in 1916.

This Adam Fox property has been the home of several businesses over the years. The earliest retail business was a paint shop that appears on the Sanborn Fire Insurance Map in 1910, followed by a hardware store. The Carmel Police Department had a station in the building and then the Carmel's Hobby Shop.

In the 1920s, furniture maker, John C. Mikel owned the building. By 1964, Adam Fox, Inc. bought the building and still runs one of the two shops. Several additions and remodelings took place over the years. In 1938, a building addition  x  was done for B. H. Ewing to add a stucco exterior and a red Spanish tile roof by contractor H. Bowles for $300, to make the building look the same as other Spanish style buildings on Ocean Avenue and Dolores Street.

In 1939, an addition  x  was done to add concrete, studs, and stucco by contractor G. Rickettsfor $250. A new exterior finish and canopy was done by Michael J. Murphy in 1946 for $250. In 1958, contractor Cort Lundon did an interior remodel for $400. In 1962, a repair for fire damage was done by contractor Clay McCullough for $600. The old garage at rear of the building was demolished by Red Eagle Lane in 1968 for $1,000. In 1975, a remodel for Carmel Crafts and Hobby was done by contractor A. O. Miller for $4,000. In 1976, a remodel was done for $4,000 by contractor A. O. Miller. In 1996, an interior remodel for a new restaurant was done by contractor Rick Griffen for $12,000. In 2002, repairs to the upstairs apartment was completed by contractor Marty Newman for $7,500.

See also
List of Historic Buildings in Carmel-by-the-Sea

References

External links

 Downtown Conservation District Historic Property Survey

1906 establishments in California
Carmel-by-the-Sea, California
Buildings and structures in Monterey County, California
History of the Monterey Bay Area